La Prensa is a Honduran newspaper, founded on October 26, 1964 by Organización Publicitaria, S.A., whose publications also include El Heraldo and Diario Deportivo Diez. In 2008, La Prensa reported its audited circulation as 61,000 units. It has full color and tabloid-sized pages.  Although it is distributed all across the country, it is in the north area of Honduras where its presence is more important.

Family business
Jorge Canahuati Larach is the president of Organización Publicitaria. His grandfather, the founder of the company, Jorge J. Larach, died in 1985. Canahuati has been a member of the Inter American Press Association Executive Committee.

Notable people
 Ángela Valle (1927-2003), writer, journalist, essayist

References

External links
 Diario La Prensa Online

Newspapers published in Honduras
Spanish-language newspapers
Publications established in 1964
Mass media in San Pedro Sula
1964 establishments in Honduras